Tetragonoderus chaudoiri is a species of beetle in the family Carabidae. It was described by Liebke in 1928.

References

chaudoiri
Beetles described in 1928